The National Energy Commission (NEC) is an interdepartmental coordinating agency of the State Council established in 2010 to coordinate the overall energy policies for the People's Republic of China. The body includes 23 members from other agencies such as environment, finance, central bank, National Development and Reform Commission.

The purpose of this new commission is to draft a new energy development strategy, evaluate energy security and coordinate international cooperation on climate change, carbon reduction and energy efficiency.

History 
China had a Ministry of Energy established in 1988 but it was disbanded five years after its portfolio overlapped with existing ministries.

In 2003, National Energy Bureau was created under the National Development and Reform Commission (NDRC) which reports to the Chinese State Council, which has broad administrative and planning control over energy in the Chinese economy.

In 2008, National Energy Administration (NEA) was established but lacked power to carry out its tasks because the energy sector management was spread between various agencies.

China has experienced power outages, concerns of growing imported energy demands, energy security and challenges coordinating energy supply and demand.

List of chairmen 
 Wen Jiabao (2010-2013)
 Li Keqiang (2013–present)

Current leadership 
 Chairman
 Li Keqiang, Premier, Politburo Standing Committee

 Vice Chairmen
 Han Zheng, First-ranked Vice-Premier, Politburo Standing Committee

 Members
He Lifeng, Minister in charge of the National Development and Reform Commission
Wang Yi, Minister of Foreign Affairs
Zhang Yi, Chairman of the State-owned Assets Supervision and Administration Commission
Wan Gang, Minister of Science and Technology 
Miao Wei, Minister of Industry and Information Technology
Geng Huichang, Minister of State Security
Lou Jiwei, Minister of Finance
Jiang Daming, Minister of Land and Resources
Zhou Shengxian, Minister of Environmental Protection
Yang Chuantang, Minister of Transport
Chen Lei, Minister of Water Resources
Gao Hucheng, Minister of Commerce 
Liu Shiyu, Vice Governor of the People's Bank of China
Wang Jun, Chair of the State Administration of Taxation
Yang Dongliang, Director of the State Bureau for Supervision and Safety
Shang Fulin, Chair of the Commission for Banking Regulation
Wang Guanzhong, People's Liberation Army Deputy Chief of Staff
Nur Bekri, Director of the National Energy Administration

See also
State Information Center
Economy of China
:Category:Energy in China

References

External links
National Energy Commission Official site

Government agencies of China
Economic development in China
Energy in China
Investment promotion agencies
2010 establishments in China
Government agencies established in 2010
Organizations based in Beijing
State Council of the People's Republic of China
Energy organizations